Begonia bogneri is a species of flowering plant in the family Begoniaceae, native to a single  locality on the Masoala Peninsula of Madagascar. Uniquely among begonias, it has linear, grass-like leaves. It does well in terrariums.

References

bogneri
Endemic flora of Madagascar
Plants described in 1973
Flora of the Madagascar lowland forests